The Nihang or Akali (lit. "the immortals") is an armed Sikh warrior order originating in the Indian subcontinent. Nihang are  believed to have originated either from Fateh Singh and the attire he wore or from the "Akali" (lit. Army of the Immortal) started by Guru Hargobind. Early Sikh military history was dominated by the Nihang, known for their victories where they were heavily outnumbered. Traditionally known for their bravery and ruthlessness in the battlefield, the Nihang once formed the irregular guerrilla squads of the armed forces of the Sikh Empire, the Sikh Khalsa Army.

Akali 
The word Akali/akaali means timeless or immortal.

Literally, one who belongs to Akaal  (beyond Time). In other words, an Akaali is that person who is subject of none but God only. Conceptually speaking, the terms Akaali, Khalsa and Sikh are synonymous. The term Akaali was first used during the time of Guru Gobind Singh Sahib. The term Akaali became popular in the last decades of the eighteenth century.

The term came to be associated with “commitment, fearlessness, boldness, struggle, and justice.”

Etymology 
Nihang may come from the Persian word for a mythical sea creature. The term owes its origin to Mughal historians, who compared the ferocity of the Akali with that of crocodiles. The meaning of Akali in Sikhism however, is the immortal army of Akal (God).

Origin 
According to Pashaura Singh and Louis E. Fenech, there exists three main theories regarding the genesis of the Nihangs. These three theories are summarized below: 

 Began with the son of Guru Gobind Singh, Fateh Singh with his blue clothing and turban with the Guru prescribing this uniform for his warriors.
 Second hypothesis claims that they originate from the disguise of Guru Gobind Singh when he escaped from Chamkaur in 1704 or 1705.
 Third theory postulates that they can be traced back to the garb of Akali Naina Singh of the Nishanwalia Misl.

Arms and attire 

Traditional Nihang dress is known as Khalsa Swarupa. This comprises full attire of superelectric blue selected by Guru Gobind Singh after conflicts with Vazir Khan, the Mughal Governor of Sirhind, several edged bracelets of iron round on each of their wrists (jangi kara) and quoits of steel (chakram) tiered in their lofty conical blue turbans, together with the either a dori kirpan (a open blade kirpan that is worn with a rope attached and was meant to be used as a quick access weapon) or a pesh kabaz - a predecessor to the modern kirpan. When fully armed a Nihang will also bear one or two swords (either the curved talwar or the straight khanda, or another type of sword like saif or sarohi on his right hip), a katar (dagger) on his left hip, a buckler made from buffalo-hide (dhal) on his back, a large chakram around his neck, and an iron chain. In times of war, arms worn on the Nihang's person would generally be reserved until the warrior lost the weapon he held, often a bow (kamaan) or spear (barcha). Armour consisted of sanjo or iron chainmail worn under an iron breastplate (char aina). Nihang war-shoes (jangi mozeh) were constructed of iron at the toe, making their pointed toes capable of inflicting cuts and stab wounds. Rarely a nihang might also be armed with a musket or a toradar (matchlock).

The Nihang were particularly known for their high turbans (dastar bunga) and their extensive use of the chakram or war-quoit. Their turbans were often pointed at the top and outfitted with a chand torra or trident called astbhuja which could be used for stabbing in close-quarters. Other times, the turbans would be armed with a bagh naka (iron claw) and one or several chakram to slice at an opponent's eyes. These steel-reinforced turbans, it was said, afforded enough protection so that there was no need for any other form of headgear. Today, Nihang still wear miniature versions of five weapons (pancha shastra) in their turbans, namely the chakram, the khanda (sword), the karud (dagger), the kirpan, and the tir (arrow).

Divisions 
There are four main factions amongst the Nihangs of the modern-era, them namely being:

Budha Dal 
Originally created for older members (over 40) by splitting the Dal Khalsa into two.

Taruna (or Tarna) Dal 
Originally created for younger members (under 40) by splitting the Dal Khalsa into two. The Taruna Dal was further divided in five jathas, each with 1300 to 2000 men and a separate drum and banner.

Bidhi Chand Dal 
Descend from lineage of Bidhi Chand, a contemporary warrior and companion of the Sikh Gurus.

Ranghreta (or Rangreta) Dal 
Prominent amongst Mazhabi Sikhs.

The latter two groups being much less prominent than the former two. Each Dal consists of both a mobile and stationary group. The mobile group of the Budha Dal, for example, is the Dalpanth. There has been incidents of conflict in the past between different groups of Akalis, even within the same faction.

Use of intoxicants

Some Nihang groups consume cannabis or shaheedi degh, purportedly to help in meditation.
 Sūkha parshaad, "Dry-sweet", is the term Nihang use to refer to it. It was traditionally crushed and taken as a liquid, especially during festivals like Hola Mohalla. It is never smoked, as this practice is forbidden in Sikhism. 

In 2001, Jathedar Santa Singh, the leader of Budha Dal, along with 20 chiefs of Nihang sects, refused to accept the ban on consumption of  shaheedi degh by the apex Sikh clergy - in order to preserve traditional Sikh practices. 
According to a recent BBC article, "Traditionally they also drank shaheedi degh, an infusion of cannabis, to become closer with God"

Nishan Sahib 

The Nihangs carry the original view of Sikhism and carry the original Nishan Sahib being  Navy/electric blue and bright yellow or basanti attire with a tegha, Dhal (shield) and katar. Yellow in Punjabi culture signifies sacrifice, revolt and honour while blue signifies courage, bravery and patriotism. Although in Punjab Blue is the colour of Khalsa and Yellow the colour of Kshatriyas the Gurus said that these are the colours of the casteless Khalsa.

Dialect 

The Nihangs have developed their own coded language, known as Khalsa bole.

See also

 Amrit Sanskar
 Damdami Taksal
 Dastar bunga
 Dumalla
 Gatka
 Shastar Vidya
 Langar
 Jhatka
 Lohgarh (Bilaspur)
 Misls
 Nishan Sahib

Notes

References 
  Dasam Granth , The  Dasam Granth  website
 Book review of the Nihang book The Beloved Forces of the Guru
 "Tribes and Castes of Punjab and N.W. Frontier Province" by  H.A. Rose (1892)
 Bhai Sahib Amrit Pal Singh 'Amrit' has presented well-researched articles on Nihangs on his website
 www.Budhadal.com

External links 
 Sikh Photography Images of Nihangs by photographer Charles Meacham
 Sarbloh.info 
 Nihangsingh.org 
 Nihang SGPC
 Photography of the daily lives of the Nihang Singhs of Punjab by photographer Nick Fleming

 
Sikh groups and sects
Punjabi words and phrases